Alfons Fryland (1 May 1888 – 29 November 1953) was an Austrian film actor. He appeared in 47 films between 1921 and 1933. He was born in Vienna, Austria-Hungary (now Austria) and died in Graz, Austria.

Selected filmography

 Labyrinth des Grauens (1921)
 The Eternal Struggle (1921)
 Kean (1921)
 Frau Dorothys Bekenntnis (1921)
 Herzogin Satanella (1921)
 Mrs. Tutti Frutti (1921)
 The Marriage of Princess Demidoff (1922)
 Prashna's Secret (1922)
 Lucrezia Borgia (1922)
 Between Evening and Morning (1923)
 Carousel (1923)
 Daisy (1923)
 The Chain Clinks (1923)
 Victim of Love (1923)
 Quo Vadis (1924)
 Arabella (1924)
 By Order of Pompadour (1924)
 The Creature (1924)
 Women You Rarely Greet (1925)
 The Island of Dreams (1925)
 The Woman without Money (1925)
 I Love You (1925)
 Fire of Love (1925)
 Hidden Fires (1925)
 The Ones Down There (1926)
 She Is the Only One (1926)
 Fedora (1926)
 I Liked Kissing Women (1926)
 The Son of Hannibal (1926)
 A Serious Case (1927)
 Make Up (1927)
 Charlotte Somewhat Crazy (1928)
 The Fate of the House of Habsburg (1928)
 The Chaste Coquette (1929)
 Roses Bloom on the Moorland (1929)
 Once at Midnight (1929)
 Ship in Distress (1929)
 A Storm Over Zakopane (1931)
 The Night of Decision (1931)

References

External links

Photographs of Alfons Fryland

1888 births
1953 deaths
Austrian male film actors
Austrian male silent film actors
Male actors from Vienna
20th-century Austrian male actors